William Lloyd Driver (November 7, 1883 – November 29, 1941) was an American football and basketball coach. He served as the head football coach at Washburn University from 1911 to 1912, at the University of Mississippi (Ole Miss) from 1913 to 1914, at Texas Christian University (TCU) from 1920 to 1921, at the Northern Branch of the College of Agriculture—now University of California, Davis—from 1923 to 1917, and at Loyola College of Los Angeles—now Loyola Marymount University—in 1929, compiling a career college football record of 58–45–7. Driver was also the head basketball coach at Texas A&M University, TCU, and Cal Aggies, tallying a career college basketball mark of 67–56.

Driver was born in Missouri in 1883. He died in California in 1941.

Coaching career
At Washburn, Driver was the 12th head football coach and athletic director; he held that position for two seasons, from 1911 until 1912. His overall coaching record was 8–8–1. This ranks him 17th in terms of total wins and 19th in terms of winning percentage.

From 1913 to 1914, he coached at Mississippi, where he compiled an 11–7–2 record. From 1920 to 1921, he coached at TCU, where he compiled a 15–4–1 season. That total included a 9–1 season in 1920. From 1923 to 1927, he coached at UC Davis and compiled an 18–23–3 record.

Between 1917 and 1920 he coached basketball at Texas A&M where he compiled an overall record of 42–13. In 1919–20, his team won the Southwest Conference championship.

Head coaching record

Football

References

1883 births
1941 deaths
American football ends
American men's basketball players
Basketball coaches from Missouri
Basketball players from Missouri
Loyola Lions football coaches
Missouri Tigers football players
Missouri Tigers men's basketball players
Ole Miss Rebels athletic directors
Ole Miss Rebels football coaches
People from Jasper County, Missouri
Players of American football from Missouri
TCU Horned Frogs athletic directors
TCU Horned Frogs football coaches
TCU Horned Frogs men's basketball coaches
Texas A&M Aggies athletic directors
Texas A&M Aggies football coaches
UC Davis Aggies football coaches
UC Davis Aggies men's basketball coaches
Washburn Ichabods football coaches
Washburn Ichabods athletic directors